Terry Wight (born 11 November 1956) is a former Australian rules footballer who played with Collingwood and Footscray in the Victorian Football League (VFL).

Notes

External links 		

		
		

1956 births
Australian rules footballers from Victoria (Australia)		
Collingwood Football Club players		
Western Bulldogs players
Living people